Phrynobatrachus pintoi is a species of frog native to Guinea. It can be found at elevations from 200 to 428 meters.

Description
Phrynobatrachus pintoi is found in forests as well as savannas. There are black spots and black bands covering its body. It has an oval, compact body shape and its snout is short and rounded.

References

Amphibians of Africa
Amphibians described in 2008
pintoi